The 1977–78 Birmingham Bulls season was the Birmingham Bulls second season of operation in the World Hockey Association. The Bulls qualified for the playoffs, losing in the quarter-finals to the Winnipeg Jets.

Offseason

Regular season

Final standings

Game log

Playoffs

Winnipeg Jets 4, Birmingham Bulls 1 – Quarterfinals

Player stats

Note: Pos = Position; GP = Games played; G = Goals; A = Assists; Pts = Points; +/- = plus/minus; PIM = Penalty minutes; PPG = Power-play goals; SHG = Short-handed goals; GWG = Game-winning goals
      MIN = Minutes played; W = Wins; L = Losses; T = Ties; GA = Goals-against; GAA = Goals-against average; SO = Shutouts;

Awards and records

Transactions

Draft picks
Birmingham's draft picks at the 1977 WHA Amateur Draft.

Farm teams

See also
1977–78 NHL season

References

External links

Birm
Birm
Birmingham Bulls seasons